Glidden State Bank was a bank in Glidden, Wisconsin. It was added to the National Register of Historic Places in 2006. The builder was Conradn Mohr

History
The bank, established in 1902, moved into its newly built location at 216 First Street in 1905. Glidden State Bank later went through a series of changes to its name, eventually becoming the Northern Street Bank. The Northern State Bank would move to a different location in Glidden in 1978.

See also
National Register of Historic Places listings in Ashland County, Wisconsin

References

Bank buildings on the National Register of Historic Places in Wisconsin
Banks based in Wisconsin
Commercial buildings completed in 1905
National Register of Historic Places in Ashland County, Wisconsin
1905 establishments in Wisconsin